Hauke Brunkhorst (born 24 October 1945)  is a German political sociologist, Professor of Sociology and Head of the Institute of Sociology at the University of Flensburg, Germany. He specializes in European constitutionalism, political theory and European affairs. He received his doctorate in 1977 from the University of Frankfurt with a thesis "". During the 2009-2010 academic year, he was the Theodor Heuss Professor at the New School for Social Research in New York City.

Publications 
 Solidarity. From Civic Friendship to a Global Legal Community, Cambridge/London (MIT Press) 2005 (Transl. of Solidarität, Frankfurt: Suhrkamp 2002).
 Adorno and Critical Theory, Cardiff (University of Wales Press) 1999.

References

External links 
1. https://web.archive.org/web/20140112134818/http://iim.uni-flensburg.de/fileadmin/ms3/inst/iim/Upload/5_Lehrstuehle/Soziologie/sonstiges/cv_brunkhorst.pdf
2. https://web.archive.org/web/20150125002228/http://iim.uni-flensburg.de/index.php?id=brunkhorst
3. https://www.amazon.com/Hauke-Brunkhorst/e/B001H6GJPG

1945 births
Living people
Academic staff of Goethe University Frankfurt
Goethe University Frankfurt alumni
Academic staff of the University of Flensburg
Academic staff of the University of Vienna
People from Dithmarschen
University of Kiel alumni
University of Freiburg alumni
Academic staff of the University of Kassel
Academic staff of Osnabrück University
Academic staff of Johannes Gutenberg University Mainz
Academic staff of the University of Duisburg-Essen
Academic staff of the Humboldt University of Berlin
German male writers
German sociologists